Ante Jozić (born 16 January 1967) is a Croatian prelate of the Catholic Church.  He has worked in the diplomatic service of the Holy See since 1999. Though appointed as apostolic nuncio and titular archbishop in 2019, injuries suffered in a traffic accident prevented him from being consecrated and taking up his post. His episcopal consecration has been postponed a second time because of the COVID-19 pandemic. He was finally consecrated on 16 September 2020.

Biography
Ante Jozić was born in Trilj, Croatia, on 16 January 1967. He was ordained a priest on 28 June 1992 and became a priest of the Diocese of Split.

He obtained a doctorate in civil and canon law.

To prepare for a diplomatic career he entered the Pontifical Ecclesiastical Academy in 1995. He entered the diplomatic service of the Holy See on 1 July 1999 and worked at the apostolic nunciatures in India, the Russian Federation, and the Philippines, and for ten years in Hong Kong as head of the Holy See Study Mission for China.

Pope Francis appointed Jozić titular archbishop of Cissa and Apostolic Nuncio to Côte d'Ivoire on 2 February 2019.  His episcopal consecration, scheduled for 1 May, was postponed after Jozić was seriously injured in a car accident in Croatia on 7 April. He was released from the hospital on 20 June. On 28 October, Paolo Borgia was appointed in his stead.

Jozić had an audience with Pope Francis on 22 January 2020 and remained a titular archbishop-elect. His episcopal ordination was initially re-scheduled for 21 March 2020, but was postponed again pending the rescinding of restrictions on mass gatherings due to the 2019–20 coronavirus pandemic.  He was appointed Apostolic Nuncio to Belarus on 21 May 2020. Jozić was ultimately consecrated bishop on 16 September 2020 Solin, Croatia, with Pietro Parolin, the Cardinal Secretary of State, serving as the principal consecrator.

Notes

See also
 List of heads of the diplomatic missions of the Holy See

References

1967 births
Living people
Pontifical Ecclesiastical Academy alumni
Diplomats of the Holy See
People from Dalmatia